The 1900 Arkansas gubernatorial election was held on September 3, 1900.

Incumbent Democratic Governor Daniel W. Jones did not stand for re-election.

Democratic nominee Jeff Davis defeated Republican nominee Harmon L. Remmel and Populist nominee Abner W. Files with 66.65% of the vote.

General election

Candidates
Jeff Davis, Democratic, incumbent Attorney General of Arkansas
Harmon L. Remmel, Republican, candidate for Governor in 1894 and 1896
Abner W. Files, Populist, candidate for Governor in 1896

Results

Notes

References

1900
Arkansas
Gubernatorial